Labichea is a genus of flowering plants in the family Fabaceae. It belongs to the subfamily Dialioideae.

The genus consists of the following species:
Labichea buettneriana F.Muell.
Labichea cassioides DC.
Labichea deserticola J.H.Ross
Labichea digitata Benth.
Labichea eremaea C.A.Gardner
Labichea lanceolata Benth.
Labichea mulliganensis A.R.Bean
Labichea nitida Benth.
Labichea obtrullata J.H.Ross
Labichea punctata Lindl.
Labichea rossii N.Gibson
Labichea rupestris Benth.
Labichea saxicola J.H.Ross
Labichea stellata J.H.Ross
Labichea teretifolia C.A.Gardner

References

Dialioideae
Fabaceae genera